Lubansenshi is a constituency of the National Assembly of Zambia. It covers the towns of Luwingu and Shimumbi in Luwingu District of Northern Province.

List of MPs

References

Constituencies of the National Assembly of Zambia
1983 establishments in Zambia
Constituencies established in 1983